Articles (arranged alphabetically) related to Zimbabwe include:



A
Abel Muzorewa, first and only prime minister of Zimbabwe Rhodesia
Africa University
Alick Macheso, pioneer sungura genre
Arthur Mutambara, current Deputy Prime Minister, former top leader within the Movement for Democratic Change
Art in Zimbabwe

B
Bambandyanalo
Baobab Books
Beitbridge Bulawayo Railway
Bindura University of Science Education
Border Gezi, politician
British South Africa Company
Bulawayo, second largest city

C
Canaan Banana, first President of Zimbabwe
Catholic University in Zimbabwe
Central Intelligence Organisation
Cecil Rhodes
Chapungu Sculpture Park, Harare
Charles Mungoshi
Chenjerai Hunzvi, leader of the War Veterans Association
Chenjerai Hove
Chinhoyi University of Technology
Chivaramakura, "tough land," a refugee farm
Charles Charamba, Gospel music guru
Chris Mhlanga, Mbira maker and performer
Christopher Mutsvangwa, Mugabe aide; former Ambassador to China
Colcom Foods
Communications in Zimbabwe
Constitution of Zimbabwe
Constituencies of Zimbabwe
Clever Maradze, Project Managementgraduate, Bachelor of Commerce in Accounting student at University of Johannesburg and resident Zvishavane

D
Dairibord
Data Control & Systems
Dambudzo Marechera
Dorothy Masuka, Zimbabwe born, but best known for work in the South African jazz scene.
Dumisani Maraire, Shona mbira player who died in 1999.
Dumiso Dabengwa, Minister of Home Affairs 1992–2000

E
Econet Wireless
Economy of Zimbabwe
Edgar Tekere
Elias Fund, nonprofit that helps children in Zimbabwe
Emmerson Mnangagwa, President of the Republic of Zimbabwe, 2017 to Present
Enoch Dumbutshena
Ephat Mujuru, mbira player

F
Federation of Rhodesia and Nyasaland
Fradreck Mujuru, Mbira maker and performer
Free Zim Youth (FZY)

G
Gabriel Chaibva, politician within the MDC
Garikayi Tirikoti, Mbira maker and performer since age 7.
Gay rights in Zimbabwe
Geography of Zimbabwe
Gold
Gold mining
Gona re Zhou National Park
Great Zimbabwe
Gweru

H
Harare, capital of Zimbabwe
Henry Munyaradzi, a Zimbabwean sculptor of international repute
Hippo Valley Estates
History of Zimbabwe
Hohodza, band promoting Zimbabwean culture

I
Ian Smith
International Organisation for Migration, Geneva-based organization
The Interpreter, a 2005 film featuring a fictional African head of state, apparently based on Robert Mugabe, seeking to avoid being sent to the International Criminal Court by the UN Security Council for crimes against humanity.
Islam in Zimbabwe

J
Joram Mariga, the "Father of Zimbabwean Sculpture", an internationally known sculptor
Jonathan Moyo, mercurial Independent, previously ZANU-PF Information minister
Jonathan Wutawunashe, influential head of a Gospel music group
Joshua Nkomo, ZAPU leader
Josiah Tongogara, Independence war hero
Joyce Mujuru, Vice President

K
Kadoma
Kadsi Formation
Ken Flower, head of Central Intelligence Organization
Kwekwe

L
Land reform in Zimbabwe
LGBT rights in Zimbabwe (Gay rights)
Limpopo River
List of cities in Zimbabwe
List of cities and towns in Zimbabwe
List of Zimbabwean companies
List of Zimbabwean musicians
List of hospitals in Zimbabwe
List of Zimbabweans
Lobengula
Look East Policy
Lord Soames
Loveness Makaure, member of the MDC
Lupane State University

M
Malawi
Manicaland Province
Margaret Dongo, Independent
Marshall P. Baron
Mashonaland
Mashonaland Central
Mashonaland East
Mashonaland West
Masvingo
Masvingo Province
Masvingo State University
Matabele
Matabeleland
Matabeleland North
Matabeleland South
Mazvikadei Dam
Mbira
Meikles
Metallurgy
Midlands Province
Midlands State University
Military of Zimbabwe
Mining
Moffat Treaty
Morgan Tsvangirai, leader of the Movement for Democratic Change
Movement for Democratic Change (pre-2005) (MDC)
Movement for Democratic Change – Mutambara (MDC)
Movement for Democratic Change – Tsvangirai (MDC)
Mozambique
Music of Zimbabwe
Mutare
Mzilikazi

N
Nathan Shamuyarira of ZANU PF
National Gallery of Zimbabwe
National Railways of Zimbabwe
National University of Science and Technology (NUST)
National Youth Service (Zimbabwe)
Ndabaningi Sithole
Ndebele people (Zimbabwe)
Nelson Chamisa of the MDC
Net*One
Northern Ndebele language
Northern Rhodesia
Nozipa Maraire
Nyasaland

O
Oliver "Tuku" Mtukudzi, does popular and traditional music, formerly of "Black Spirits"
Operation Murambatsvina

P
Pishai Muchauraya, member of the MDC
Place names in Zimbabwe
Politics of Zimbabwe
Prostitution in Zimbabwe

R
Regions of Zimbabwe
Rhodesia
Robert Mugabe, former President of Zimbabwe
Roy Bennett (politician), MDC politician
Rudd Concession

S
Salisbury
The Boy Scouts Association of Zimbabwe
Sculpture of Zimbabwe
Shona language
Simon Muzenda, ex-Vice president
Solomon Mutswairo
Solusi University
Southern Africa
Southern Rhodesia
Stella Chiweshe-Dubbed "Queen of Mbira"
Sungura

T
Tanganda Tea
Tanzania
Theological College of Zimbabwe TCZ
Thomas Mapfumo-Well-known Zimbabwean musician for the chimurenga genre
Tonderai Kasu, medical doctor
Togara Muzanenhamo, poet
Transport in Zimbabwe
Tsitsi Dangarembga
Two Tone (magazine)

U
University of Zimbabwe
University Without Walls

V
Valley Dam, irrigation project
The Voice, Zanu PF newspaper

W
Water supply and sanitation in Zimbabwe
Welshman Ncube, opposition politician
White people in Zimbabwe
Women's University in Africa

Y
Yvonne Vera

Z

Zambezi River
Zanu PF Politburo
Zezuru
Zhing-zhongs, Chinese goods of presumably low quality
Zimbabwe
Zimbabwe African National Liberation Army ZANLA
Zimbabwe African National Union ZANU
Zimbabwe African National Union - Patriotic Front ZANU-PF
Zimbabwe and the Commonwealth of Nations
Zimbabwe at the Commonwealth Games
Zimbabwe (disambiguation)
Zimbabwe Open University
Zimbabwe parliamentary elections, 2005
Zimbabwe Parks and Wildlife Estate
Zimbabwean bonds
Zimbabwean bond coins
Zimbabwean bond notes
Zimbabwean dollar
Zimbabwean hip hop

See also

Lists of country-related topics

 
Zimbabwe